The 2020s (pronounced "twenty-twenties" shortened to "the '20s" and referred to as the twenties) is the current decade, which began on January 1, 2020, and will end on December 31, 2029.

The 2020s began with the COVID-19 pandemic — the first reports of the virus were published on December 31, 2019, though the first cases are said to have appeared nearly a month earlier — which caused a global economic recession as well as continuing financial inflation concerns and a global supply chain crisis.

Several anti-government demonstrations and revolts occurred in the early 2020s and world leaders have called it an "angry decade", including a continuation of those in Hong Kong that started in the late 2010s against extradition legislation, protests against certain local, state and national responses to the COVID-19 pandemic, others around the world, particularly in the United States against racism and police brutality, one in India against agriculture and farming acts, one in Israel against judicial reforms, an ongoing political crisis in Peru, Armenia and Thailand, and many in Belarus, Myanmar, Afghanistan, Sri Lanka, Iran, China and Russia against various forms of governmental jurisdiction, corruption and authoritarianism.

Many coups have been attempted, and some have even succeeded, contributing to protests with a majority happening in African countries. Military juntas and dictatorships have been established as a result, such as in Mali in 2020 and 2021, in Sudan in September and November 2021, in Burkina Faso in January and September 2022, and one in the Central African Republic, Niger, Guinea, Guinea-Bissau, São Tomé, and Tunisia. While in other parts of the world, coups have been attempted in Germany, Myanmar, Peru, Armenia, Ukraine, January 6 United States Capitol attack and 2022–2023 Brazilian election protests.

Ongoing military conflicts include the Myanmar civil war, the Ethiopian civil conflict (2018–present), and the Russo-Ukrainian War. The latter included the 2022 Russian invasion of Ukraine, making it the largest conventional military offensive in Europe since World War II, and resulting in a refugee crisis, disruptions to global trade, and an exacerbation of economic inflation. Smaller conflicts include the Insurgency in the Maghreb (2002–present), the Mexican drug war, and the Somali Civil War.

With many extreme weather events worsening in the early 2020s, several world leaders have called it the "decisive decade" for climate action as ecological crises continue to escalate. In February 2023, a series of powerful earthquakes killed at least 45,000 people in Turkey and Syria; this event fell within the top ten deadliest earthquakes of the 21st century.

Technological advances and changes have been made and benefitted many, such as the use of online learning, streaming services, e-commerce and food delivery services to compensate for lockdown orders. 5G networks have launched around the globe at the start of the decade as well, and became prevalent in smartphones. Significant improvements in the complexity of artificial intelligence have occurred with artificial intelligence art and chatbots becoming more accessible and mainstream. The private space race also greatly accelerated in the 2020s, as did government-funded space projects such as the James Webb Space Telescope and Ingenuity helicopter.

Politics and wars

Major conflicts

The prominent wars of the decade include:

International wars

Civil wars

Revolutions and major protests

Successful revolutions and otherwise major protests of the decade include, but are not limited to:

Nuclear proliferation

Terrorist attacks

Note: To be included, entries must be notable (have a stand-alone article) and described by a consensus of reliable sources as "terrorism". They also must have 100 or more fatalities reported.

The most prominent terrorist attacks committed against civilian populations during the decade include, but are not limited to:

Political trends

Electoral trends
Having suffered decline in the years after the Great Recession, the centre-left politics and the 1990s political model (like progressivism, liberalism, social democracy, and third way policies) experienced a resurgence across Europe and the Anglosphere in the early 2020s, with New Statesman suggesting various causes, including natural shifts in the electoral cycle and conservatives' unpopularity among university graduates and voters under the age of 40.

Deaths
Sitting leaders that died in office:

In 2020: Sheik Sabah al-Sabah, Sultan Qaboos bin Said, and Pierre Nkurunziza.

In 2021: Idriss Déby, John Magufuli, and Jovenel Moïse.

In 2022: Khalifa bin Zayed Al Nahyan and Elizabeth II

Former world leaders who died:

In 2020: Hosni Mubarak, Valéry Giscard d'Estaing, John Turner, Daniel arap Moi, Pranab Mukherjee, Amadou Toumani Touré, Jerry Rawlings, Mamadou Tandja, Tabaré Vázquez, Javier Pérez de Cuéllar, Pierre Buyoya, John Cremona, Sidi Ould Cheikh Abdallahi, Kuniwo Nakamura, Litokwa Tomeing, Moussa Traoré, Pascal Lissouba, Branko Kostić, Lee Teng-hui, Benjamin Mkapa, Miloš Jakeš, Rafael Leonardo Callejas Romero, Abdul Halim Khaddam, Joachim Yhombi-Opango, Manuel Serifo Nhamadjo, Mike Moore, and Janez Stanovnik.

In 2021: Gustavo Noboa, Ali Mahdi Muhammad, Didier Ratsiraka, Bonfoh Abass, Mamnoon Hussain, Arturo Armando Molina, Hissène Habré, Jorge Sampaio, Abdelkader Bensalah, Kenneth Kaunda, Anerood Jugnauth, Abdelaziz Bouteflika, Enrique Bolaños, Roh Tae-woo, Chun Doo-hwan, Benigno Aquino III, Carlos Menem, F. W. de Klerk, James Fitz-Allen Mitchell, Norodom Ranariddh, Kinza Clodumar, and Karolos Papoulias.

In 2022: Toshiki Kaifu, Ernest Shonekan, Ibrahim Boubacar Keïta, Christos Sartzetakis, Amos Sawyer, Rupiah Banda, Karl Offmann, Ayaz Mutallibov, Dušan Čkrebić, Mwai Kibaki, Leonid Kravchuk, Stanislav Shushkevich, Romeo Morri, Bujar Nishani, Evaristo Carvalho, Jacob Nena, Shinzo Abe, José Eduardo dos Santos, Luis Echeverría, Francisco Morales Bermúdez, Fidel V. Ramos, Mikhail Gorbachev, Balakh Sher Mazari, Karmenu Mifsud Bonnici, Jiang Zemin, Adolfas Šleževičius, Edgar Savisaar and Pope Benedict XVI.

In 2023: Abdelsalam Majali, Constantine II of Greece, Álvaro Colom, Sherif Ismail, Pervez Musharraf, Lubomír Štrougal, Ivan Silayev, Sergey Tereshchenko, Hans Modrow, Ahmed Qurei and Gérard Latortue.

Prominent political events

Coups

Africa

Americas

Asia

Europe

Oceania

World leaders
 2020 – 2021 – 2022 – 2023

Assassinations and attempts

Prominent assassinations, targeted killings, and assassination attempts include:

Disasters

Non-natural disasters

Aviation

General

Marine

Natural disasters

Earthquakes and tsunamis

Note: This table is a chronological list of earthquakes reported with 7.5 or greater or that have reported at least 100 fatalities.

Tropical cyclones

Tornadoes

Floods, avalanches, and mudslides
Note: This section reports only floods with 200 or more deaths and avalanches and landslides involving 30 or more deaths.

Volcanic eruptions

Droughts, heat waves, and wildfires

Pollution

Other natural events
Beginning in 2019 until 2022, a huge swarm of desert locusts threatened to engulf massive portions of the Middle East, Africa and Asia.

Economics

Events

2020
The Brexit withdrawal agreement went into effect at the end of January 2020 with the UK completing its economic withdrawal from the EU at the end of that year. 
 The United States, Mexico, and Canada signed the USMCA agreement, which came into effect on 1 July 2020.

2021
 The African Continental Free Trade Area, encompassing 54 of the African Union states comes into effect.
 Ever Given, a large container ship, runs aground in the Suez Canal for a week causing massive disruption of global trade.
 El Salvador became the first country to accept Bitcoin as legal tender, after the Legislative Assembly votes 62–84 to pass a bill submitted by President Nayib Bukele classifying the cryptocurrency as such.

2022
 The Regional Comprehensive Economic Partnership, the largest free trade area in the world, comes into effect for Australia, Brunei, Cambodia, China, Indonesia, Japan, South Korea, Laos, Malaysia, Myanmar, New Zealand, the Philippines, Singapore, Thailand, and Vietnam.
 Elon Musk completes his $44 billion acquisition of Twitter

2023
 Croatia adopts the euro and joins the Schengen Area, becoming the 20th member state of the Eurozone and the 27th member of the Schengen Area.

Trade
The World Trade Organization reported that trade growth had stagnated and that trade restrictions were increasing as the decade began. The sectors most affected by import restrictions were mineral and fuel oils (17.7%), machinery and mechanical appliances (13%), electrical machinery and parts (11.7%), and precious metals (6%). Regional trade agreements were also found to be increasing.

Stock markets

Crashes

Cybersecurity and hacking

Health

Epidemics/Outbreaks

Pandemics

Science and technology

Space

2020
 Space company SpaceX sent two NASA astronauts to the International Space Station on 30 May 2020, marking the first time a private company completed a crewed orbital spaceflight mission.
 NASA launched the Perseverance rover and Ingenuity helicopter drone on 30 July 2020 as part of their Mars 2020 mission to search for signs of ancient life on Mars. On 19 April 2021, the Ingenuity helicopter drone performed the first powered controlled flight by an aircraft on a planet other than Earth.
 The Royal Astronomical Society announced the detection of phosphine gas in Venus' atmosphere on 14 September 2020, which is known to be a strong predictor for the presence of microbial life.

2021
China sends Nie Haisheng, Liu Boming and Tang Hongbo to assemble and then occupy and work aboard the Tiangong Space Station.
Following the formal releases of three videos of UFOs (also known as UAPs) in 2020, a report on the subject by the United States Intelligence Community would be published on 25 June 2021 with the report concluding that UFOs existed. This would be the first time a government would officially confirm the existence of UFOs, though no conclusion was made on what these phenomena were, extraterrestrial or otherwise.
On 11 July 2021, Virgin Galactic became the first spaceflight company to independently launch a paying civilian into outer space using the 50-mile high definition of outer space, having flown Virgin Galactic founder Sir Richard Branson above the 50 mile mark, enabling him and the rest of the crew to experience approximately 3 minutes of weightlessness above Earth's atmosphere.
In July 2021, Blue Origin became the first spaceflight company to launch a fully automated spacecraft with civilian passengers into space, carrying its founder Jeff Bezos and three others. Two of the flight's crew members, Dutch student Oliver Daemen (age 18) and American aviator Wally Funk (age 82), became both the youngest and oldest people respectively to go to space (Funk's record was beaten nearly 3 month's later when actor William Shatner entered space onboard Blue Origin NS-18, at the age of 90).
The James Webb Space Telescope was launched on 25 December 2021, 12:20 UTC using an Ariane 5 launch vehicle from Kourou, French Guiana.

2022
 The Double Asteroid Redirection Test (DART) successfully made contact with Dimorphos, in a test operated by NASA to test potential planetary defense to near-Earth objects.
 NASA successfully launched Artemis 1, an uncrewed Moon-orbiting mission, after several months of delays.

Artificial intelligence
 DeepMind solves the protein folding problem to 90 percent accuracy, a 50-year-old grand challenge, at CASP14 in 2020.
 Text-to-image AI art systems like DALL-E (1 and 2) and Stable Diffusion are announced, capable of generating highly detailed and realistic images from text prompts.

Communications and electronics
5G became increasingly widespread by 2020. 
By 2020, 3D printing had reached decent quality and affordable pricing which allowed many people to own 3D printers.
8K resolution and 4K resolution becomes prevalent in consumer electronics.

Software and electronic platforms
 Support for Adobe Flash Player ended on 31 December 2020.
Windows 11 is released on 5 October 2021, succeeding Windows 10.
Support for Internet Explorer ended on 15 June 2022.
Support for Windows 8.1 ended on 10 January 2023.

Technology
The BBC reports that for the "first time someone who has had a complete cut to their spinal cord has been able to walk freely... because of an electrical implant that has been surgically attached to his spine".
Sales of electric vehicles have grown significantly and this is expected to continue through the decade.

Society

Social effects of the COVID-19 pandemic

Medical experts advised, and local authorities often mandated stay-at-home orders to prevent gatherings of any size. Such gatherings could be replaced by teleconferencing, or in some cases with unconventional attempts to maintain social distancing with activities such as a balcony sing-along for a concert, or a "birthday parade" for a birthday party. Replacements for gatherings were seen as significant to mental health during the crisis. Social isolation among alcohol users also adopted a trend towards Kalsarikänni or "pantsdrunking", a Finnish antisocial drinking culture.

Low-income individuals were more likely to contract the coronavirus and to die from it. In both New York City and Barcelona, low-income neighborhoods were disproportionately hit by coronavirus cases. Hypotheses for why this was the case included that poorer families were more likely to live in crowded housing and work in low-skill jobs, such as supermarkets and elder care, which were deemed essential during the crisis. In the United States, millions of low-income people may lack access to health care due to being uninsured or underinsured. Millions of Americans lost their health insurance after losing their jobs. Many low-income workers in service jobs became unemployed.

The coronavirus pandemic was followed by a concern for a potential spike in suicides, exacerbated by social isolation due to quarantine and social-distancing guidelines, fear, and unemployment and financial factors. Many countries reported an increase in domestic violence and intimate partner violence attributed to lockdowns amid the COVID-19 pandemic. Financial insecurity, stress, and uncertainty led to increased aggression at home, with abusers able to control large amounts of their victims' daily life. Midlife crisis is a major concern in domestic violence, social implications and suicides for middle-aged adults amid the pandemic. UN Secretary-General António Guterres called for a domestic violence and midlife crisis "ceasefire".

Population
The population of Egypt reached 100 million in February 2020.
The world population reached 8 billion in November 2022.
Population growth, life expectancy and birth rates declined globally in the early 2020s, driven by the COVID-19 pandemic.
India is projected to surpass China to become the most-populous country in 2023.

Race
The murder of George Floyd led to civil unrest and protests across the United States and internationally in 2020.

Gender

24.3% of all national parliamentarians were women as of February 2019. 11 women were serving as Head of State and 12 as Head of Government in June 2019. 20.7% of government ministers were women as of January 2019. There are wide regional variations in the average percentages of women parliamentarians. As of February 2019, these were: Nordic countries, 42.5%; Americas, 30.6%; Europe excluding Nordic countries, 27.2; sub-Saharan Africa, 23.9; Asia, 19.8%; Arab States, 19%; and the Pacific, 16.3%. Rwanda has the highest number of women parliamentarians worldwide, 61.3% of seats in the lower house. About 26% of elected local parliamentarians are women.

Many states swore in their first female leaders during the 2020s including Presidents Katerina Sakellaropoulou (Greece), Samia Suluku Hassan (Tanzania), Sandra Mason (Barbados), Xiomara Castro (Honduras), Katalin Novák (Hungary), Dina Boluarte (Peru) and Prime Ministers Kaja Kallas (Estonia), Fiamē Naomi Mata'afa (Samoa), Robinah Nabbanja (Uganda), Najla Bouden (Tunisia), Magdalena Andersson (Sweden), Giorgia Meloni (Italy).

Environmentalism
 The 2019–20 Australian bushfire season devastated the environment of Australia.
 Team Seas is an international collaborative fundraiser founded by the YouTuber/Influencers Mark Rober and MrBeast on 29 October 2021, as a follow-up to Team Trees. The fundraiser's aim was to raise US$30 million to remove 30 million pounds of trash from the ocean by the end of the year. They also partnered with the Ocean Cleanup and the Ocean Conservancy.

LGBT rights
 A law allowing third gender option on driver licenses took effect in New Hampshire.
 Switzerland banned discrimination based on sexuality due to a referendum, putting into effect a law previously introduced in 2018, that was subsequently blocked by the government that requested a referendum to be held on the matter first.
 In Northern Ireland, the first same-sex marriage took place after legalizing legislation took effect in January 2020.

 In Costa Rica, same-sex marriage and joint adoption by same-sex couples became legal on 26 May 2020.
 The Supreme Court of the United States ruled that job discrimination against workers for their sexual orientation or gender identity is illegal.
 The Equality Act passed the United States House of Representatives on February 25, 2021.
 In Argentina, nonbinary ID cards with an "X" gender marker started to be issued by the Ministry of the Interior.
 The U.S State Department issued its first ever passport with an "X" gender marker in October 2021, intended to support nonbinary people.
 Same-sex marriage became legal in Switzerland after a 2021 referendum, enforced beginning in July 2022.
 In Chile, same-sex marriage and joint adoption by same-sex couples became legal on 10 March 2022.
 Same-sex marriage became legal in Slovenia on 8 July 2022 after the Constitutional Court of Slovenia ruled that the ban on same-sex marriages violated the national constitution.
 Same-sex marriage became legal in Cuba on 27 September 2022 after the Cuban Family Code referendum passed.

Global goals and issues
Development in global goals and issues – including goals or progress related to the largest causes of human death – during the decade, according to reports that systematically track, quantify or review associated progress.
As of 2022
 Progress of the Paris Agreement or global climate change mitigation goals
 The United in Science 2022 report by the WMO, summarizes latest climate science-related updates and assesses recent climate change mitigation progress as "going in the wrong direction".
 A report by the World Resources Institute assesses the state of nationally determined contributions (NDCs), finding they need to be strengthened by about six times for alignment with what may be enough to reach the Paris Agreement's 1.5 °C goal. The UNFCCC's NDC synthesis report suggests that based on the latest NDCs the carbon budget for a 50% likelihood of limiting warming to 1.5 °C would be used up by around 2032.
 A Lancet Countdown report publishes data of indicators that show "countries and companies continue to make choices that threaten the health and survival of people in every part of the world". It calls for an immediate, health-centred response at a critical juncture of recovery from crises.
 The WMO reports atmospheric levels of the three main greenhouse gases, carbon dioxide, methane and nitrous oxide, all reached record highs, with methane concentrations showing a record jump in 2021. The WMO Secretary-General concludes that "we are heading in the wrong direction", with time "running out".
 Climate Action Tracker systematically assesses the state of progress of actions of climate goals in an overview, finding that none of the indicators is on track to reach their 2030 targets, with insufficient speed for six indicators, and well below the required pace for 21, five heading in the wrong direction, and data being insufficient to evaluate the remaining eight.
The UNEP's Emissions Gap Report finds that no credible "pathway" to the 1.5 °C climate goal is in place. Similarly, a UNFCCC synthesis about "long-term low-emission development strategies" warns that many net-zero targets "remain uncertain and postpone into the future critical action that needs to take place now".
 Deforestation mitigation goals
 An annual report by the World Resources Institute shows that tropical regions lost 9.3 million acres of primary old-growth forest in 2021, a decline of 11% from 2020, and about equal to both 2018 and 2019.
 The Forest Declaration Assessment finds that a drop of only 6.3% in deforestation in 2021 is "leaving the world off track from its goals of ending forest loss by 2030".
 Public health goals
 The UN's "The State of Food Security and Nutrition in the World" report finds that the number of people affected by hunger globally rose by 46 million to 828 million in 2021. 3.1 billion people could not afford a healthy diet in 2020, an increase of 112 million from 2019.
 A WHO report indicates collective progress toward a 15% relative reduction in population levels of physical inactivity by 2030 is insufficient and that about 500 million people will develop heart disease, obesity, diabetes or other diseases if they don't increase their physical activity.
 Global budgets and government spending
 The OECD and IEA report that global public subsidies for fossil fuels almost doubled from 2020 to $700bn in 2021.
 General well-being
 The Club of Rome, authors of the 1972 The Limits to Growth, and research institutes like the Potsdam Institute for Climate Impact Research publish the "Earth for All" report, concluding that to increase the wellbeing of humanity, addressing rising inequality is key to mitigating related issues such as climate change with many current policies disproportionately burdening lower income groups.
 Sustainable Development Goals (other than the above or in general)
 The only UN report that monitors global progress on the 2030 Agenda for Sustainable Development indicates the agenda is in "grave danger".
 GDP-alternative progress or sustainable development indices
 Human Development Index (HDI): the Human Development Report 2021-22 concludes that for the first time, the global HDI value declined for a second year, with living standards declining in 90% of countries.

Popular culture

Fashion

Fashion trends of the early 2020s have been largely inspired by the 1990s and 2000s. Popular brands in the United Kingdom, United States, and Australia during this era include Adidas, Fila, Nike, New Balance, Globe International, Vans, Hurley, Kappa, Tommy Hilfiger, Asics, Ellesse, Ralph Lauren, Forever 21, Playboy and The North Face. Wearing a decorative mask to prevent the disease COVID-19 from spreading was a fashion trend in the early 2020s.

Film

The COVID-19 pandemic heavily impacted film releases early in the decade, resulting in a drastic drop in box office revenue as well as many films postponing their release or shifting it to a streaming services. Avatar: The Way of Water is the highest-grossing film of the decade, and currently the fourth-highest-grossing film of all time. Other financially successful films at the box office include Top Gun: Maverick, No Time to Die, and Jurassic World Dominion. Superhero films continued to do well financially, with Spider-Man: No Way Home being the second-highest-grossing of the decade. Other successful superhero films include The Batman, as well as much of Marvel Studios' "Multiverse Saga of the MCU" and DC Studios' "DC Extended Universe" films.

Critically and financially successful films nominated for awards like Nomadland, Guillermo del Toro's Pinocchio, Soul, CODA, Everything Everywhere All at Once, Marcel the Shell with Shoes On, Licorice Pizza, and The Fabelmans were popular.

Movie reboots also were popular, as many movie reboots released on streaming services. Some of these film remakes and reboots include Zoey 102, Bill & Ted Face the Music, Space Jam: A New Legacy, Borat Subsequent Moviefilm, Ghostbusters: Afterlife, Top Gun: Maverick, He's All That, Beverly Hills Cop: Axel Foley, A Christmas Story Christmas, Scream, The Little Mermaid, Indiana Jones and the Dial of Destiny, Snow White, Coming 2 America, and Sam & Victor's Day Off.

Television

The 2020s started off with streaming services like Netflix, Amazon Prime Video, Binge, HBO Max, Showtime, Hulu, and Disney+. Additional streaming services such as Discovery+, Paramount+, and Peacock were released as well. In the 2020s more than any other time period, reboots and reunion episodes of older shows became widespread, including That '90s Show, How I Met Your Father, Night Court, Animaniacs, Punky Brewster, The Conners, The Wonder Years, Saved by the Bell, Cobra Kai, Friends: The Reunion ', Return to Hogwarts, And Just Like That..., Dragging the Classics: The Brady Bunch, Heartbreak High, two new seasons of Phineas and Ferb and Futurama, as well as Fraggle Rock, iCarly, Rugrats, Beavis and Butt-Head, and Frasier. It's Always Sunny in Philadelphia became the longest-running live-action cable comedy in 2021, and Young Sheldon continued (the show seeing talent such as Simon Helberg reprise his role as Howard Wolowitz in 2021).

Streaming television such as Pluto TV and YouTube TV become more popular. New and critically acclaimed adult animation like Midnight Gospel and Smiling Friends launched in the 2020s.

A variety of shows on streaming such as Squid Game, Never Have I Ever, Tulsa King, The White Lotus, Succession, Ginny & Georgia, Wandavision, Ted Lasso, The Morning Show, Only Murders in the Building, Love, Victor, Wednesday, Extraordinary Attorney Woo, Tiger King, Old Enough! and others gained popularity.

Music

By 2020, TikTok had become an extremely popular music platform on social media. Streaming on platforms such as Spotify, YouTube Music, Amazon Music and Apple Music increased due to the COVID-19 pandemic. Festivals such as Coachella were cancelled because of the virus. The COVID-19 pandemic devastated the touring business.

Pop, hip hop, K-pop, Phonk, R&B, nu disco and synthpop all dominated the early part of the decade, with the most popular artists being Ariana Grande, Billie Eilish, Lizzo, Lil Nas X, Megan Thee Stallion, Dua Lipa, Jack Harlow, The Weeknd, Justin Bieber, Taylor Swift, BTS, Doja Cat, Olivia Rodrigo, Blackpink, Harry Styles, Bad Bunny, Ed Sheeran, Cardi B, Beyoncé, the Kid Laroi, Lil Baby and more.

An alarming trend that increased in the late 2010s and continued into the early 2020s is the gun violence and murder seen within the hip hop community, with 15 high-profile hip hop artists murdered since the start of the decade (as of November 2022), the most notable being Pop Smoke, Houdini, Einár, Young Dolph, Drakeo the Ruler, PnB Rock, Takeoff and others.

Video games

The ninth generation of consoles began in 2020 with the release of the Xbox Series X/S and PlayStation 5, while the Nintendo Switch continued to be popular from the previous decade. Technological advancements in consoles included support for real-time ray tracing graphics and output for 4K or even 8K resolution. Physical media continued to be replaced by online distribution of games, with the Xbox Series S and the PlayStation 5 Digital Edition lacking an optical drive. The Steam Deck was released in 2022 as Valve's attempt to bring PC-level gaming to a Nintendo Switch-style handheld format.

Critically successful games such as Elden Ring, Ghost of Tsushima, God of War Ragnarök, and The Last of Us Part II were released and won multiple best game of the year awards, signaling a shift towards narrative-driven and single-played focused gaming compared with the end of the 2010s where popularity of multiplayer gaming dominated. Widely successful multiplayer games includes Fall Guys, Fortnite, Genshin Impact, It Takes Two, Overwatch 2, Valorant, and Warzone. The detective-party game Among Us surged in popularity in 2020 and became a global sensation, largely attributed in to global stay-at-home orders during the COVID-19 pandemic.

Nintendo continued to successfully produce games for the Nintendo Switch, with Animal Crossing: New Horizons selling over 40 million copies, and making it the second-best-selling game on the console. The Nintendo Switch's sales also remained strong in the 2020s due in part to games such as Nintendo Switch Sports, Paper Mario: The Origami King, Super Mario 3D All-Stars, Bowser's Fury, Kirby and the Forgotten Land, WarioWare: Get It Together!, Pokémon Legends: Arceus, Splatoon 3, Pokémon Scarlet and Violet, and the long-awaited Pikmin 4.

Video game film and television adaptations became more financially and critically successful compared with previous decades. Film releases include Nintendo and Illumination's 2023 film The Super Mario Bros. Movie, a trilogy of Sonic the Hedgehog movies, the video game-themed Ready Player Two and Free Guy, as well as Uncharted. Television adaptations include Arcane: League of Legends, Castlevania, Cyberpunk: Edgerunners, Dota: Dragon's Blood, Dragon Age: Absolution, The Last of Us and The Witcher.

===Architecture===

There is a revival in expressionist architecture. The SoFi Stadium was completed on 8 September 2020 and is a component of Hollywood Park, a master-planned neighborhood in development in Inglewood, California. The stadium serves as a home to the Los Angeles Rams and the Los Angeles Chargers. SoFi Stadium hosted Super Bowl LVI in February 2022. The stadium is also set to host the opening and closing ceremonies, soccer and archery in the 2028 Summer Olympics, which will be hosted in Los Angeles, California, United States of America.

The Unity Tower was finally completed on 30 September 2020. The construction of the building originally started in 1975, but stopped permanently in 1981 because of economic constraints and political unrest at the time. Due to the unfinished building's resemblance to a skeleton, it was nicknamed after Skeletor, the arch-villain in He-Man and the Masters of the Universe, which was popular in Poland at the time construction began.

In 2021, Renzo Piano completes the COVID-19-delayed Academy Museum of Motion Pictures in Los Angeles, California.

Sports

2020

 The COVID-19 pandemic leads to the cancellation or rescheduling of numerous sporting events globally:
The 2020 Summer Olympics and Paralympics were postponed to July–August 2021. This was the first Olympic Games to be postponed rather than cancelled in history.

The 2020 T20 Cricket World Cup, originally scheduled to take place in Australia, was rescheduled to occur in India in 2021. The tournament was ultimately held in the UAE and Oman (primarily the former) in 2021, with Australia winning the final against New Zealand to earn its first T20 World Cup title.

Sporting leagues such as the North American National Hockey League Major League Baseball and National Basketball Association, and the English Premier League adapt their seasons and championship play around COVID-19 by placing players in "bubbles" and televising games played in empty arenas and stadiums.

2021

 The Tampa Bay Buccaneers defeated the Kansas City Chiefs 31–9 in Super Bowl LV to win their second title in the NFL; Tom Brady won Super Bowl MVP for his performance.
 Due to cross-border restrictions during the COVID-19 pandemic, the National Hockey League (NHL) realigns its team divisions, with all seven Canadian teams competing in their own division for the first time. Tampa Bay Lightning win the second of back-to-back Stanley Cup Finals and third championship overall, defeating the Montreal Canadiens.
The Atlanta Braves won their first World Series since 1995.
 With the easing of COVID restrictions in the UK, the 2021 Wimbledon Championships are held with full attendances. Novak Djokovic wins the men's singles title, his 20th Grand Slam win equaling Roger Federer and Rafael Nadal's record.
 Canada won their 27th ice hockey World title in 2021 IIHF World Championships, after defeating the reigning champion Finland in the final in overtime.
 Hideki Matsuyama wins the Masters, becoming the first-ever Japanese golfer to win a major golfing championship.
 The Milwaukee Bucks won their first NBA championship in 50 years and their second title overall, with Giannis Antetokounmpo named Finals MVP.
 Italy won UEFA Euro 2020 by defeating England 3–2 on penalties.
 Argentina wins the 2021 Copa América by defeating Brazil 1–0.
 The United States wins the 2021 CONCACAF Gold Cup by defeating Mexico 1–0.
 The 2020 Summer Olympics take place in Tokyo, Japan, being the country's fourth time hosting the games. The United States wins the most gold and overall medals, with China coming in second and host Japan coming in third.
 Max Verstappen wins the 2021 Formula One World Championship over Lewis Hamilton at the Yas Marina Circuit.

2022

 Senegal won the 2021 AFCON by defeating Egypt 4–2 on penalties.
 The Los Angeles Rams defeated the Cincinnati Bengals 23–20 in Super Bowl LVI to win their second title in the NFL; Cooper Kupp won Super Bowl MVP for his performance.
 The 2022 Winter Olympics take place in Beijing, China, becoming the first city to host both the summer and winter Olympic Games. Norway wins the most gold and overall medals, with Germany coming in second and host China coming in third.
 The Kansas Jayhawks beat the North Carolina Tar Heels 72–69 in the 2022 NCAA Division I to win their fourth title; Ochai Agbaji won MVP for his performance.
 Finland won their first ever ice hockey Olympic gold medal in 2022 Winter Olympics and 4th ice hockey World title in 2022 IIHF World Championships in same year.
 The Golden State Warriors defeated the Boston Celtics in the 2022 NBA Finals in a best-of-seven series winning their 7th title. Guard Stephen Curry was awarded the Finals MVP.
 The Colorado Avalanche defeat the Tampa Bay Lightning in a best-of-seven series, four games to two and winning their third Stanley Cup in 2021–22 NHL season.
 Argentina won 2022 FIBA AmeriCup by defeating Brazil 75–73.
 Australia won 2022 FIBA Asia Cup by defeating Lebanon 75–73.
 Spain won EuroBasket 2022 by defeating France 88–76.
 Kalle Rovanperä broke the late Colin McRae's record of becoming the youngest ever Rally World Champion after winning in 2022 Rally New Zealand.
 Max Verstappen won the 2022 Formula One World Championship at over Sergio Pérez and Charles Leclerc at the Suzuka Circuit.
 Argentina won 2022 FIFA World Cup by defeating France 4–2 on penalties, with Lionel Messi winning the Golden Ball and Kylian Mbappé winning the Golden Boot.

2023

 LeBron James, playing for the Los Angeles Lakers, scored his 38,388th career point in a game against the Oklahoma City Thunder, surpassing Kareem Abdul-Jabbar to become the all-time leading scorer in NBA history.
 The Kansas City Chiefs defeated the Philadelphia Eagles 38–35 in Super Bowl LVII. Chiefs quarterback Patrick Mahomes was awarded both NFL MVP and Super Bowl MVP, the first player to win both in the same season since 1999.

Food
Food delivery apps such as DoorDash, Instacart, Menulog, Uber Eats, Grubhub and Just Eat Takeaway flourished due to the COVID-19 pandemic. Indoor dining was also closed in many countries due to the COVID-19 pandemic, and upon re-opening the usage of QR codes and other technologies in the restaurant industry increased compared to the 2010s in order to comply with pandemic restrictions.

Literature

Books published throughout the decade include The Vanishing Half, Leave the World Behind, Transcendent Kingdom, The Glass Hotel, Memorial and The City We Became. Recent releases on this decade include How to Prevent the Next Pandemic by Bill Gates, Meet Me by the Fountain: An Inside History of the Mall by Alexandra Lange, Wikipedia @ 20 by Joseph M. Reagle Jr. and Jackie Koerner, and The Candy House.

Over a year after Friends: The Reunion, Matthew Perry released Friends, Lovers, and the Big Terrible Thing (which had a foreword written by Lisa Kudrow). The book became a New York Times best-seller.

See also

List of decades
2020s in political history

Timeline
The following articles contain brief timelines which list the most prominent events of the decade:

References

External links

 
21st century
2020s
2020s decade overviews